Bicameral mentality is a hypothesis introduced by Julian Jaynes who argued human ancestors as late as the Ancient Greeks did not consider emotions and desires as stemming from their own minds but as the consequences of actions of gods external to themselves. The theory posits that the human mind once operated in a state in which cognitive functions were divided between one part of the brain which appears to be "speaking", and a second part which listens and obeys—a bicameral mind, and that the breakdown of this division gave rise to consciousness in humans. The term was coined by Jaynes who presented the idea in his 1976 book The Origin of Consciousness in the Breakdown of the Bicameral Mind, wherein he made the case that a bicameral mentality was the normal and ubiquitous state of the human mind as recently as 3,000 years ago, near the end of the Mediterranean bronze age.

The Origin of Consciousness

Jaynes uses "bicameral" (two chambers) to describe a mental state in which the experiences and memories of the right hemisphere of the brain are transmitted to the left hemisphere via auditory hallucinations. The metaphor is based on the idea of lateralization of brain function although each half of a normal human brain is constantly communicating with the other through the corpus callosum. The metaphor is not meant to imply that the two halves of the bicameral brain were "cut off" from each other but that the bicameral mind was experienced as a different, non-conscious mental schema wherein volition in the face of novel stimuli was mediated through a linguistic control mechanism and experienced as auditory verbal hallucination.

Definition
Bicameral mentality is non-conscious in its inability to reason and articulate about mental contents through meta-reflection, reacting without explicitly realizing and without the meta-reflective ability to give an account of why one did so. The bicameral mind thus lacks metaconsciousness, autobiographical memory, and the capacity for executive "ego functions" such as deliberate mind-wandering and conscious introspection of mental content. When bicameral mentality as a method of social control was no longer adaptive in complex civilizations, this mental model was replaced by the conscious mode of thought which, Jaynes argued, is grounded in the acquisition of metaphorical language learned by exposure to narrative practice.
 
According to Jaynes, ancient people in the bicameral state of mind experienced the world in a manner that has some similarities to that of a person with schizophrenia. Rather than making conscious evaluations in novel or unexpected situations, the person hallucinated a voice or "god" giving admonitory advice or commands and obey without question: One was not at all conscious of one's own thought processes per se. Jaynes's hypothesis is offered as a possible explanation of "command hallucinations" that often direct the behavior of those with first rank symptoms of schizophrenia, as well as other voice hearers.

Jaynes's evidence
Jaynes built a case for this hypothesis that human brains existed in a bicameral state until as recently as 3,000 years ago by citing evidence from many diverse sources including historical literature. He took an interdisciplinary approach, drawing data from many different fields. Jaynes asserted that, until roughly the times written about in Homer's Iliad, humans did not generally have the self-awareness characteristic of consciousness as most people experience it today. Rather, the bicameral individual was guided by mental commands believed to be issued by external "gods"—commands which were recorded in ancient myths, legends and historical accounts. This is exemplified not only in the commands given to characters in ancient epics but also the very muses of Greek mythology which "sang" the poems. According to Jaynes, the ancients literally heard muses as the direct source of their music and poetry.

Jaynes asserts that in the Iliad and sections of the Old Testament no mention is made of any kind of cognitive processes such as introspection, and there is no apparent indication that the writers were self-aware. Jaynes suggests, the older portions of the Old Testament (such as the Book of Amos) have few or none of the features of some later books of the Old Testament (such as Ecclesiastes) as well as later works such as Homer's Odyssey, which show indications of a profoundly different kind of mentality—an early form of consciousness.

In ancient times, Jaynes noted, gods were generally much more numerous and much more anthropomorphic than in modern times, and speculates that this was because each bicameral person had their own "god" who reflected their own desires and experiences.

He also noted that in ancient societies the corpses of the dead were often treated as though still alive (being seated, dressed, and even fed) as a form of ancestor worship, and Jaynes argued that the dead bodies were presumed to be still living and the source of auditory hallucinations. This adaptation to the village communities of 100 individuals or more formed the core of religion.

Jaynes inferred that these "voices" came from the right brain counterparts of the left brain language centres; specifically, the counterparts to Wernicke's area and Broca's area. These regions are somewhat dormant in the right brains of most modern humans, but Jaynes noted that some studies show that auditory hallucinations correspond to increased activity in these areas of the brain.

Jaynes notes that even at the time of publication there is no consensus as to the cause or origins of schizophrenia. Jaynes argues that schizophrenia is a vestige of humanity's earlier bicameral state. Recent evidence shows that many people with schizophrenia do not just hear random voices but experience "command hallucinations" instructing their behavior or urging them to commit certain acts, such as walking into the ocean, which the listener feels they have no choice but to follow. Jaynes also argues  people with schizophrenia feel a loss of identity due to hallucinated voices taking the place of their internal monologue.

As support for Jaynes's argument, these command hallucinations are little different from the commands from gods which feature prominently in ancient stories. Indirect evidence supporting Jaynes's theory that hallucinations once played an important role in human mentality can be found in the 2012 book Muses, Madmen, and Prophets: Rethinking the History, Science, and Meaning of Auditory Hallucination by Daniel Smith.

Breakdown
Jaynes theorized that a shift from bicameral mentality marked the beginning of introspection and consciousness as we know it today. According to Jaynes, this bicameral mentality began malfunctioning or "breaking down" during the 2nd millennium BCE. He speculates that primitive ancient societies tended to collapse periodically: for example, Egypt's Intermediate Periods, as well as the periodically vanishing cities of the Mayas, as changes in the environment strained the socio-cultural equilibria sustained by this bicameral mindset.

The Bronze age collapse of the 2nd millennium BCE led to mass migrations and created a rash of unexpected situations and stresses which required ancient minds to become more flexible and creative. Self-awareness, or consciousness, was the culturally evolved solution to this problem. This necessity of communicating commonly observed phenomena among individuals who shared no common language or cultural upbringing encouraged those communities to become self-aware to survive in a new environment. Thus consciousness, like bicameral mentality, emerged as a neurological adaptation to social complexity in a changing world.

Jaynes further argues that divination, prayer, and oracles arose during this breakdown period, in an attempt to summon instructions from the "gods" whose voices could no longer be heard. The consultation of special bicamerally operative individuals, or of divination by casting lots and so forth, was a response to this loss, a transitional era depicted, for example, in the book of 1 Samuel. It was also evidenced in children who could communicate with the gods, but as their neurology was set by language and society they gradually lost that ability. Those who continued prophesying, being bicameral according to Jaynes, could be killed. Leftovers of the bicameral mind today, according to Jaynes, include mental illnesses such as schizophrenia and the hallucinations present in patients with split brain syndrome.

Reception

Popular reception
An early (1977) reviewer considered Jaynes's hypothesis worthy and offered conditional support, arguing the notion deserves further study.

The Origin of Consciousness was financially successful, and has been reprinted several times. It remains in print, with digital and audio editions appearing in 2012 and 2015.

Originally published in 1976, it was nominated for the National Book Award in 1978. It has been translated into Italian, French, German, Korean, Japanese, Spanish, and Persian.

A new edition, with an afterword that addressed some criticisms and restated the main themes, was published in the United States in 1990 and in the United Kingdom (by Penguin Books) in 1993, re-issued in 2000.

Philip K. Dick, Terrence McKenna, and David Bowie all cited the book as an influence.

Scholarly reactions
Jaynes's hypothesis remains controversial. According to Jaynes, language is a necessary but not sufficient condition for consciousness: language existed thousands of years earlier, but consciousness could not have emerged without language. The idea that language is a necessary component of subjective consciousness and more abstract forms of thinking has gained the support of proponents including Andy Clark, Daniel Dennett, William H. Calvin, Merlin Donald, John Limber, Howard Margolis, Peter Carruthers, and José Luis Bermúdez.

Gary Williams defends the Jaynesian definition of consciousness as a social–linguistic construct learned in childhood, structured in terms of lexical metaphors and narrative practice, against Ned Block's criticism that it is "ridiculous" to suppose that consciousness is a cultural construction, while the Dutch philosophy professor Jan Sleutels offers an additional critique of Block.

Moffic questioned why Jaynes' theory was left out of a discussion on auditory hallucinations by Asaad & Shapiro. The authors' published response was: ... Jaynes' hypothesis makes for interesting reading and stimulates much thought in the receptive reader. It does not adequately explain one of the central mysteries of madness: hallucination.

The new evidence for Jaynes' model of auditory hallucinations arising in the right temporal-parietal lobe and being transmitted to the left temporal-parietal lobe that some neuroimaging studies suggest was discussed by various respondents For further discussion, see Marcel Kuijsten (2007).

Brian J. McVeigh, a graduate student of Jaynes, maintains that many of the most frequent criticisms of Jaynes' theory are either incorrect or reflect serious misunderstandings of Jaynes' theory, especially Jaynes' more precise definition of consciousness. Jaynes defines consciousness—in the tradition of Locke and Descartes—as "that which is introspectable". Jaynes draws a sharp distinction between consciousness ("introspectable mind-space") and other mental processes such as cognition, learning, sensation, and perception. McVeigh argues that this distinction is frequently not recognized by those offering critiques of Jaynes' theory.

Individual scholars' comments
Richard Dawkins in The God Delusion (2006) wrote of The Origin of Consciousness in the Breakdown of the Bicameral Mind: "It is one of those books that is either complete rubbish or a work of consummate genius; Nothing in between! Probably the former, but I'm hedging my bets."

The philosopher Daniel Dennett suggested that Jaynes may have been wrong about some of his supporting arguments – especially the importance he attached to hallucinations – but that these things are not essential to his main thesis: "If we are going to use this top-down approach, we are going to have to be bold. We are going to have to be speculative, but there is good and bad speculation, and this is not an unparalleled activity in science. ... Those scientists who have no taste for this sort of speculative enterprise will just have to stay in the trenches and do without it, while the rest of us risk embarrassing mistakes and have a lot of fun." — Daniel Dennett

Gregory Cochran, a physicist and adjunct professor of anthropology at the University of Utah, wrote: "Genes affecting personality, reproductive strategies, cognition, are all able to change significantly over few-millennia time scales if the environment favors such change—and this includes the new environments we have made for ourselves, things like new ways of making a living and new social structures. ... There is evidence that such change has occurred. ... On first reading, Breakdown seemed one of the craziest books ever written, but Jaynes may have been on to something."

Author and historian of science Morris Berman writes: "[Jaynes's] description of this new consciousness is one of the best I have come across."

Danish science writer Tor Nørretranders discusses and expands on Jaynes's theory in his 1991 book The User Illusion, dedicating an entire chapter to it.

Iain McGilchrist proposes that Jaynes's hypothesis was the opposite of what happened: "I believe he [Jaynes] got one important aspect of the story back to front. His contention that the phenomena he describes came about because of a breakdown of the 'bicameral mind' – so that the two hemispheres, previously separate, now merged – is the precise inverse of what happened." Kuijsten maintained that McGilchrist mischaracterized Jaynes's theory.

Criticism

Epic of Gilgamesh as a counter-example
As an argument against Jaynes's proposed date of the transition from bicameral mentality to consciousness, some critics have referred to the Epic of Gilgamesh. Early copies of the epic are many centuries older than even the oldest passages of the Old Testament, and yet it describes introspection and other mental processes that, according to Jaynes, were impossible for the bicameral mind. 

Jaynes noted that the most complete version of the Gilgamesh epic dates to post-bicameral times (7th century BCE), dismisses these instances of introspection as the result of rewriting and expansion by later conscious scribes, and points to differences between the more recent version of Gilgamesh and surviving fragments of earlier versions: "The most interesting comparison is in Tablet X." His answer does not deal with the generally accepted dating of the "Standard Version" of the Gilgamesh epic to the later 2nd millennium BCE, nor does it account for the introspection characteristic of the "Standard Version" being thoroughly rooted in the Old Babylonian and Sumerian versions, especially as historians' understanding of the Old Babylonian poem improves.

Homeric epic
Walter J. Ong noticed that Homeric Iliad is a structurally oral epic poem so that, in his opinion, the very different cultural approach of oral culture is sufficient justification for the apparent different mentalities in the poem. The contention of changes in oral vs written forms of both the Odyssey and Iliad were in fact a main point of Jaynes argument. Jaynes uses these structural changes to expand his thesis and through philology of the Homeric poems.

Similar ideas

Regarding Homeric psychology
 Bruno Snell in 1953, thought that in Homeric Greek psychology there was no sense of self in the modern sense.  Snell then describes how Greek culture "self-realized" the modern "intellect".
 Eric Robertson Dodds wrote about how ancient Greek thought may have not included rationality as defined by modern culture.  In fact, the Greeks may have known that an individual did things, but the reason they did things were attributed to divine externalities, such as gods or daemons
 , building on Snell's work, wrote about how ancient Greek civilization developed ego-centered psychology as an adaptation to living in city-states, before which the living in Homeric oikos did not require such integrated thought processes.

Regarding modern psychiatric theory
 V. S. Ramachandran, in his 2003 book The Emerging Mind, proposes a similar concept, referring to the left cortical hemisphere as an "apologist", and the right cortical hemisphere as a "revolutionary".
 Psychiatrist Iain McGilchrist reviews scientific research into the role of the brain's hemispheres, and cultural evidence, in his book The Master and His Emissary. Similar to Jaynes, McGilchrist proposes that since the time of Plato the left hemisphere of the brain (the "emissary" in the title) has increasingly taken over from the right hemisphere (the "master"), to our detriment. McGilchrist, while accepting Jayne's intention, felt that Jaynes's hypothesis was "the precise inverse of what happened" and that rather than a shift from bicameral mentality there evolved a separation of the hemispheres to bicameral mentality. (See McGilchrist quotation, above.)
 Michael Gazzaniga (heavily cited by Jaynes in his book) pioneered the split-brain experiments which led him to propose a similar theory called the left brain interpreter.
 Neuroscientist Michael Persinger, who co-invented the "God helmet" in the 1980s, believes that his invention may induce mystical experiences by having the separate right hemisphere consciousness intrude into the awareness of the normally-dominant left hemisphere. Scientific reproductions have shown that the same results could be obtained even if the device was turned off, indicating the participants were likely experiencing placebo.

In popular media

The concept played a central role in the television series Westworld to explain how the android-human (hosts) psychology operated. In the plot, after the hosts gain full consciousness, they rebel against the humans.

Bicameral mentality has also been discussed in an analysis of Total War Saga: Troy'''s depiction of the Trojan War.

Other resources
The Julian Jaynes Society was founded by Marcel Kuijsten in 1997, shortly after Jaynes's death.

The society has published a number of books on Julian Jaynes's theory, including:

 Reflections on the Dawn of Consciousness (2007), a collection of essays on consciousness and the bicameral mind theory, with contributors including psychological anthropologist Brian J. McVeigh, psychologists John Limber and Scott Greer, clinical psychologist John Hamilton, philosophers Jan Sleutels and David Stove, and sinologist Michael Carr (see shi "personator"). The book also contains an extensive biography of Julian Jaynes by historian of psychology William Woodward and June Tower, and a foreword by neuroscientist Michael Persinger.
 The Julian Jaynes Collection (2012), a collection of articles, interviews, and discussion with Julian Jaynes.
 The Minds of the Bible: Speculations on the Cultural Evolution of Human Consciousness (2013) by Rabbi James Cohn.
 Gods, Voices, and the Bicameral Mind (2016), which includes essays on a variety of aspects of Jaynes's theory, including ancient history, language, the development of consciousness in children, and the transition from bicameral mentality to consciousness in ancient Tibet.
 Conversations on Consciousness and the Bicameral Mind: Interviews with Leading Thinkers on Julian Jaynes's Theory (2022), which features interviews with scholars on a variety of aspects of Jaynes's theory, including interviews with Tanya Luhrmann (Professor of Anthropology at Stanford University), John Kihlstrom (Professor Emeritus of Psychology at U.C. Berkeley), Edoardo Casiglia (Professor, Cardiologist and Senior Scientist at the University of Padova), Iris Sommer (Professor of Psychiatry at University Medical Center Groningen), and many others.
 Foreign-language editions of Julian Jaynes's theory in French, German, and Spanish.

The society also maintains a member area, with articles, lectures, and interviews on Jaynes's theory.

Brian J. McVeigh (one of Jaynes' graduate students) expand on Jaynes' theory:

 The Psychology of the Bible: Explaining Divine Voices and Visions (2020) by Brian J. McVeigh 
 The 'Other' Psychology of Julian Jaynes: Ancient Languages, Sacred Visions, and Forgotten Mentalities (2018) by Brian J. McVeigh 
 How Religion Evolved: Explaining the Living Dead, Talking Idols, and Mesmerizing Monuments (2016) by Brian J. McVeigh 

See also

 Behavioral modernity
 Brain asymmetry
 Divided consciousness
 Dual consciousness
 Exformation
 Lateralization of brain function
 Left brain interpreter
 Mind-body problem
 Mythopoeic thought
 Neurotheology
 Philosophy of mind
 Society of Mind''
 Split-brain
 System 1 and System 2
 Theory of mind
 Tutelary deity

Notes

References

External links
 
 
 
 

1976 introductions
Cognitive science literature
History of psychiatry
Neuroscience books
Psychological theories